Vice Squad (French: Brigade des moeurs) is a 1959 French crime film directed by Maurice Boutel and starring Eddie Barclay, Colette Ripert and Michel Beaufort.

Partial cast

References

Bibliography 
 Philippe Rège. Encyclopedia of French Film Directors, Volume 1. Scarecrow Press, 2009.

External links 
 

1959 films
1959 crime films
French crime films
1950s French-language films
Films directed by Maurice Boutel
1950s French films